Simon Murray (born 22 March 1992) is a Scottish professional footballer who plays as a striker for Scottish Premiership club Ross County.

After beginning his senior career with Montrose, Murray played for several junior clubs before returning to senior football with Arbroath in 2014. He signed for Dundee United in January 2015, but initially remained with Arbroath on loan. After two seasons in the United first team, Murray moved to Hibernian in 2017. He spent the latter part of the 2017–18 season on loan at Dundee, then moved to South African club Bidvest Wits in July 2018. He returned to Scotland during 2020, when he signed for Queen's Park, with whom he would lead the side in back-to-back league titles and a rise to the Scottish Championship. He signed for Ross County in January 2023.

Early life
Murray was born in Dundee. His father Gary Murray was also a professional footballer, playing for Montrose and Hibernian. After playing for a number of youth teams, including Dundee Celtic Boys Club, Dee Club and Dundee United Social Club, Murray joined Montrose as a youth player.

Playing career

Early career
Murray began his professional career with Montrose. He made his only appearance for the first team as a substitute against Queen's Park at Hampden in May 2011. After a loan spell at Dundee-based junior club Downfield, Murray joined another junior club, Tayport, in February 2012.

After leaving Tayport, Murray spent almost a year living in Australia. On his return to Scotland, he briefly played junior football for Dundee Violet before signing for Arbroath in May 2014. Murray worked as a plumber while playing for Arbroath. After scoring 18 goals in 28 matches for Arbroath, Murray was signed by Dundee United for a £50,000 fee in January 2015. He was immediately loaned back to Arbroath for the rest of the 2014–15 season.

Dundee United
Murray made his debut for Dundee United against Aberdeen in August 2015. He scored his first goal six days later, in his first away game for United, the second goal in a 2–0 win at Motherwell. Murray scored seven goals for United in the 2015–16 season, as they were relegated to the Scottish Championship.

Murray scored a hat-trick for United in their first home game of the 2016–17 season in a 6–1 win over Cowdenbeath in the group stages of the League Cup. He scored 18 goals in all competitions for United in 2016–17. United won the 2016–17 Scottish Challenge Cup and progressed to the Premiership play-off final, but lost 1–0 on aggregate to Hamilton. Murray was sent off for two bookable offences in the first leg, but the second yellow card (and therefore the red) was appealed.

Hibernian
Soon after the play-off final defeat, Murray signed for Hibernian. He scored seven goals in his first four appearances for Hibs, in their League Cup group. He then scored on his league debut for Hibs, the third goal in a 3–1 win against Partick Thistle.
On 24 October 2017, Murray scored the only goal in the Edinburgh Derby which saw Hibernian win 1–0 against Heart of Midlothian.

On 31 January 2018, Murray moved to Dundee on loan for the remainder of the 2017–18 season.

Bidvest Wits
Hibernian sold Murray to South African club Bidvest Wits for an undisclosed fee in July 2018. Murray suffered an injury to his anterior cruciate ligament in 2019, which prevented him from playing for several months. He intimated in February 2020 that he would like to return to Scotland.

Queen's Park
After returning to Scotland, Murray joined League Two club Queen's Park in September 2020. He scored six goals in eleven appearances in his first season with the club as they were promoted as divisional champions.

On 10 September 2021, Murray was awarded with the Scottish League One Player of the Month for August 2021, having scored four goals in five games in the league for that month. He was then unavailable for much of the next six months with injury and the team struggled to win matches in his absence, drawing half of the 36 fixtures to finish in fourth place and reach the Scottish Championship play-offs. On 15 May 2022, fit-again Murray scored the winning goal from the penalty spot during extra time in the second leg of the play-off final to defeat Airdrieonians (who had finished runners-up in the regular season, 21 points ahead of Queen's Park); this secured back-to-back promotions for the Spiders, meaning they would compete in the second tier of Scottish football for the first time in nearly forty years.

On 16 June 2022, Murray signed a new one-year contract extension with Queen's Park. On 7 January 2023, Murray would net 4 goals in a single game against Cove Rangers in a 0–6 away win which would open up a 4-point gap at the top of the Scottish Championship.

Ross County
Murray signed for Scottish Premiership club Ross County on 31 January 2023 for an undisclosed fee. The same day, he would make his debut for the Staggies as a substitute in a league draw at home draw against his former club Hibernian.

Career statistics

Honours
Dundee United
 Scottish Challenge Cup: 2016-17

Individual

Scottish League One Player of the Month: August 2021

References

External links

Living people
1992 births
Footballers from Dundee
Scottish footballers
Association football forwards
Scottish Football League players
Scottish Professional Football League players
Scottish Junior Football Association players
Montrose F.C. players
Downfield F.C. players
Dundee Violet F.C. players
Arbroath F.C. players
Dundee United F.C. players
Tayport F.C. players
Hibernian F.C. players
Dundee F.C. players
Scottish expatriate footballers
Expatriate soccer players in South Africa
Scottish expatriate sportspeople in South Africa
Bidvest Wits F.C. players
Queen's Park F.C. players
South African Premier Division players
Ross County F.C. players